In infrared astronomy, the K band is an atmospheric transmission window centered on 2.2 μm (in the near-infrared 136 THz range). HgCdTe-based detectors are typically preferred for observing in this band.

See also
 Absolute magnitude
 UBV photometric system

References

Electromagnetic spectrum
Infrared imaging